Canoeing at the Friendship Games took place in Grünau, East Berlin, East Germany between 21 and 22 July 1984. 12 events (9 men's and 3 women's) were contested.

Medal summary

Men's events

Women's events

Medal table

See also
 Canoeing at the 1984 Summer Olympics

References

Friendship Games
Friendship Games
Friendship Games